Cathy Jean Ferguson (born July 22, 1948) is an American former competition swimmer, Olympic champion, and former world record-holder.  She competed at the 1964 Olympic Games in Tokyo, Japan, where she received the gold medal for winning the women's 100-meter backstroke, and another gold as a member of the first-place U.S. team in the women's 4×100-meter medley relay.

Cathy Ferguson was one of six world record holders in the 100m backstroke final at the 1964 Olympics. She proved to be the best of this distinguished field by taking the gold medal with a new record of 1:07.7. Having set a world record over 200m the previous month, she thus became the record holder at both backstroke distances. She also set two world records in the medley relay the second of these coming at the Tokyo Olympics where she was a member of the winning U.S. team.  Ferguson was a student at Burbank High School in Burbank, California, when she became an Olympic champion.

Ferguson was inducted into the International Swimming Hall of Fame as an "Honor Swimmer" in 1978.

See also
 List of members of the International Swimming Hall of Fame
 List of Olympic medalists in swimming (women)
 World record progression 100 metres backstroke
 World record progression 200 metres backstroke
 World record progression 4 × 100 metres medley relay

References

External links
 
 
 
 Image of U.S. Olympic swimmers Cathy Ferguson, Sharon Stouder and Claudia Kolb at LA Swim Stadium, California, 1964. Los Angeles Times Photographic Archive (Collection 1429). UCLA Library Special Collections, Charles E. Young Research Library, University of California, Los Angeles.

1948 births
Living people
American female backstroke swimmers
World record setters in swimming
Olympic gold medalists for the United States in swimming
Pan American Games bronze medalists for the United States
Pan American Games silver medalists for the United States
Sportspeople from Stockton, California
Swimmers at the 1963 Pan American Games
Swimmers at the 1964 Summer Olympics
Swimmers at the 1967 Pan American Games
Medalists at the 1964 Summer Olympics
Pan American Games medalists in swimming
Medalists at the 1963 Pan American Games
Medalists at the 1967 Pan American Games
21st-century American women